Theodor Koik (2 January 1888 Türi – 4 November 1941 Verkhoturye prison camp, Sverdlovsk Oblast, Russia) was an Estonian politician. He was a member of Estonian Constituent Assembly. On 2 May 1919, he resigned his position and he was replaced by Jaan Piiskar.

References

1888 births
1941 deaths
Members of the Estonian Constituent Assembly
People from Türi
People who died in the Gulag
Estonian people who died in Soviet detention